{{Infobox film
| name           = Greyfriars Bobby
| image          = GFBposter.jpg
| caption        = Official theatrical poster
| director       = Don Chaffey
| producer       = 
| writer         = Robert Westerby
| based_on       = {{based_on|Greyfriars Bobby|Eleanor Atkinson}}
| starring       = 
| music          = Francis Chagrin
| cinematography = Paul Beeson
| editing        = Peter Tanner
| studio         = Walt Disney Productions
| distributor    = Buena Vista Distribution
| released       = 
| runtime        = 91 minutes
| country        = United States
| language       = English
| budget         = 
| gross          = $1.4 million
}}Greyfriars Bobby is a 1961 American drama film starring Donald Crisp and Laurence Naismith in a story about two Scottish men who compete for the affection of a Skye Terrier named Bobby.  The screenplay by Robert Westerby was based upon the 1912 novel Greyfriars Bobby by Eleanor Atkinson which was based, in turn, upon an incident in 19th century Edinburgh involving a dog that came to be known as Greyfriars Bobby. It was the second film based upon Atkinson's novel, the first being Challenge to Lassie in which Crisp also starred. The film was directed by Don Chaffey and shot at Shepperton Studios and on location in Scotland. The film has been released to DVD  and Disney+.

Plot
A little Skye Terrier named Bobby is the pet of a Scottish farmer and his wife but the dog loves an old shepherd hired on the farm called Auld Jock. When money grows scarce on the farm, Auld Jock is fired.  He travels to Edinburgh, and Bobby follows him. Auld Jock dies in poverty in an inn and is buried in Greyfriar's Kirkyard. Bobby returns to Auld Jock's grave every night to sleep.

Against the wishes of his wife, the graveyard caretaker James Brown tries to shoo Bobby away, but Bobby always finds his way back to the grave. Bobby endears himself to all, especially the neighborhood children. Brown and a restaurant owner, Mr. Traill, compete for the affections of the dog. Brown alleges Traill should pay Bobby's license fee, which he refuses on principle, not being Bobby's master.

Mr. Traill is summoned to the court for a hearing, where he pleads not guilty. Mr. Brown is also present in the court, but he tells Mr. Traill he is sick, and can't get out of bed. Mr. Traill is told to come back the next day, with Bobby as well.

Bobby's fate rests with the Lord Provost of Edinburgh and, without a license and someone to take responsibility for Bobby, he may be destroyed. The children of Edinburgh contribute their pennies for Bobby's license. Bobby is declared a Freeman of the City and adopted by the populace of Edinburgh.

Cast
 Donald Crisp as James Brown
 Laurence Naismith as Mr. Traill
 Alex Mackenzie as Auld Jock
 Duncan Macrae as Sgt. Davie Maclean
 Andrew Cruickshank as Lord Provost
 Gordon Jackson as Farmer
 Rosalie Crutchley as Farmer's Wife
 Freda Jackson as Old Woman Caretaker
 Moultrie Kelsall as Magistrate
 Joyce Carey as First Lady
 Vincent Winter as Tammy
 Jameson Clark as Constable
 Jack Lambert as Doctor
 Bruce Seton as Prosecutor
 Joan Juliet Buck as Ailie
 Hamish Wilson as Hamish
 Kay Walsh as Mrs. Brown

ReceptionVariety commented, "Greyfriars Bobby sets out to melt the heart and does it skillfully. Central character is a little Skye terrier, and this engaging little animal is quite irresistible...Patiently and brilliantly trained, Bobby wraps up the stellar honors for himself and the humans, knowing they don't stand a chance, wisely are content to play chorus. Nevertheless, there are some very effective pieces of thesping, largely by Scottish actors. Laurence Naismith gives a strong, likeable performance as the kindly eating-house owner who takes Bobby under his wing..."

Comic book adaptation
 Dell Four Color #1189 (November 1961)

See also
 Greyfriars Bobby, cultural referenceThe Adventures of Greyfriars Bobby'' (2005 film)

References

External links
 
 
 

1961 films
American historical drama films
1960s English-language films
Walt Disney Pictures films
Films about dogs
Films based on American novels
Films directed by Don Chaffey
Films produced by Walt Disney
Films set in Edinburgh
Films set in Scotland
Films set in 1865
Films set in 1866
Films set in 1867
Films shot in Edinburgh
Greyfriars Bobby
Films adapted into comics
1960s American films